Thailand is competing at the 2013 World Aquatics Championships in Barcelona, Spain between 19 July and 4 August 2013.

Swimming

Thai swimmers achieved qualifying standards in the following events (up to a maximum of 2 swimmers in each event at the A-standard entry time, and 1 at the B-standard):

Men

Women

Synchronized swimming

Thailand has qualified eleven synchronized swimmers.

References

External links
Barcelona 2013 Official Site
Thailand Swimming Association 

Nations at the 2013 World Aquatics Championships
2013 in Thai sport
Thailand at the World Aquatics Championships